Robert Gough may refer to:
 Robert Gough (actor), English actor
 Robert Gough (priest), Irish Anglican priest 
 Bobby Gough, English footballer